"Nice for What" is a song recorded by Canadian rapper Drake from his fifth studio album Scorpion (2018). It was released by Young Money Entertainment and Cash Money Records as the second single from the album on April 6, 2018, along with its music video. The song was produced by Murda Beatz, Noah "40" Shebib and Corey Litwin with co-production handled by Blaqnmild. It features additional vocals by Big Freedia and 5th Ward Weebie. It contains a sample from "Ex-Factor", written and performed by Lauryn Hill, which itself samples "Can It Be All So Simple", written and performed by Wu-Tang Clan. The latter song also samples "The Way We Were". Therefore, Hill, the eight members of Wu-Tang Clan, and Marvin Hamlisch, Alan Bergman and Marilyn Bergman are credited among the composers.

It debuted at number one on the US Billboard Hot 100, replacing Drake's own "God's Plan" and becoming his fifth US number one. It also topped the UK Singles Chart and ARIA Singles Chart, becoming his second number-one song of 2018 in the two countries after "God's Plan". Rolling Stone ranked it 54th on their list of the '100 Best  Songs of the 2010s'. In 2021, The Guardian ranked it number-one on their list of 'Drake's 30 Greatest songs'. The song was awarded two ASCAP Awards, including Top Rap Song, and was nominated for Best Rap Performance at the 61st Annual Grammy Awards.

Background
On March 14, 2018, Lauryn Hill's son Joshua Omaru Marley posted a snippet of the song on Snapchat. Drake later confirmed an upcoming Murda Beatz-produced single during an Instagram Live session. On April 5, Drake made a surprise appearance during a Majid Jordan concert in Toronto. "The reason I'm here tonight is because I'm back in the city finishing my album," he told the audience. "I've got a new single dropping tomorrow night, too, just in case you got some free time."

Composition
"Nice for What" is an upbeat bounce song which contains elements of early 2000s R&B, with a length of three minutes thirty seconds. It samples Lauryn Hill's song "Ex-Factor" (1998), "Drag Rap" by the Showboys (1986), "Get Your Roll On" by Big Tymers (2000), and also features clips from performances by Big Freedia. Lyrically, the hook of Drake's song samples Lauryn Hill singing about "cutting loose in the midst of a relationship".

Music video
Directed by Karena Evans, the accompanying music video shows women carrying out various activities, including swimming, dancing, modeling, playing with children, horse-riding, and holding a business meeting. It features guest appearances from, in order of appearance, Olivia Wilde, Misty Copeland, Issa Rae, Rashida Jones, Jourdan Dunn, Tracee Ellis Ross, Tiffany Haddish, Yara Shahidi, Zoe Saldana, Elizabeth and Victoria Lejonhjärta, Letitia Wright, Bria Vinaite, Emma Roberts, Syd, Michelle Rodriguez and Drake himself. Evans called it an honour to work on the video, writing on Instagram that it was "a privilege and a blessing to have told this story with every single one of you revolutionary women, both in front and behind the camera".

Critical reception
"Nice for What" received positive reviews from music critics, with many praising its promotion of female empowerment. Hugh McIntyre of Forbes regarded the "perfectly-pitched" song as "another perfect delivery from the biggest artist in hip-hop", writing that the "vocal sample helps the track stand out from much of the rest of his discography". Kevin Lozano of Pitchfork awarded the song "Best New Track", praising Drake for "smoothly handling the impeccable production from Murda Beatz", and lauding the song as "a fantastic piece of hip-hop machinery" and "one of Drake's most complete releases in some time".

Chris DeVille of Stereogum deemed the song "a big, brash, almost obnoxiously loud New Orleans bounce-inspired production", describing it as "extremely poppy and sounds like a bid for continued commercial dominance".

Billboard named "Nice for What" the fifth-best song of 2018. Rolling Stone also named "Nice for What" the fifth-best song of 2018, and ranked it 54th on their list of the '100 Best  Songs of the 2010s'.

Commercial performance
In the United States, Drake became the first artist to have a new number-one debut replace his former number-one debut ("God's Plan") at the top of the Hot 100. It debuted with 88,000 downloads sold and 60.4 million streams. "Nice for What" became the 30th song in Billboard history to enter at number one. It also became Drake's fifth US number-one song overall and third as a lead artist. The song also became the first song to debut on the Mainstream R&B/Hip-Hop chart in the top 10. "Nice for What" topped the Hot 100 for four consecutive weeks before it was replaced on May 14, 2018, by Childish Gambino's "This Is America". It then returned for a fifth non-consecutive week at the number one spot on the issue date June 2, 2018. On the issue dated July 14, 2018, "Nice for What" became the first song to reach number one in four nonconsecutive runs. It topped the Hot 100 for eight nonconsecutive weeks. On July 21, 2018, it was replaced at the top by another Drake song, “In My Feelings” and slipped to the number four spot. It ultimately remained in the top ten for 17 weeks.

Awards and nominations

Personnel
Credits adapted from Tidal and Qobuz.

 Aubrey Graham — vocals, lyrics, composition
 Paul "Nineteen85" Jeffries – co-production, composition, lyrics, additional vocals
 Noah "40" Shebib –  production, mixing, lyrics, composition
 Noel Cadastre — recording engineer
 Maneesh Bidaye — lyrics, additional vocals, composition
 Corey Litwin – production
 No I.D. – lyrics
 Harley Arsenault – assistant production, lyrics, mixing assistance, composition
 Greg Moffet – mixing assistance
 Ronald Moonoo – mixing assistance
 Chris Quock – recording engineering assistance
 Noel "Gadget" Campbell – mixing
 Mike Gaydusek – record engineering
 Big Freedia – additional vocals
 5thward Weebie – additional vocals
 Glenishe "Bobby Jean" Rowe – additional vocals

Charts

Weekly charts

Year-end charts

Decade-end charts

Certifications

Release history

References

2018 songs
2018 singles
Billboard Hot 100 number-one singles
Canadian Hot 100 number-one singles
Drake (musician) songs
Number-one singles in Australia
Songs written by Drake (musician)
Songs written by Raekwon
Songs written by Marvin Hamlisch
Songs written by RZA
Songs written by Method Man
Songs written by Lauryn Hill
Songs written by Ghostface Killah
Song recordings produced by Murda Beatz
Cash Money Records singles
UK Singles Chart number-one singles
Young Money Entertainment singles
Songs with feminist themes